Pafford is a surname. Notable people with the surname include:

Caroline Pafford Miller (1903–1992), American writer
Arch Pafford, politician in New Brunswick, Canada
John Pafford (MP)
John Henry Pyle Pafford (1900–1996), English librarian and soldier
Mark S. Pafford (born 1966), Florida Democratic politician
Ward B. Pafford (1911–2011), president of the University of West Georgia

See also
Combe Pafford, village in Torbay in the English county of Devon
Spafford